26th New York Film Critics Circle Awards
January 21, 1961(announced December 29, 1960)

The ApartmentandSons and Lovers
The 26th New York Film Critics Circle Awards, honored the best filmmaking of 1960.

Winners
Best Film (tie):
The Apartment
Sons and Lovers
Best Actor:
Burt Lancaster - Elmer Gantry
Best Actress:
Deborah Kerr - The Sundowners
Best Director (tie):
Jack Cardiff - Sons and Lovers
Billy Wilder - The Apartment
Best Screenplay:
Billy Wilder and I. A. L. Diamond - The Apartment
Best Foreign Language Film:
Hiroshima Mon Amour • France/Japan

References

External links
1960 Awards

1960
New York Film Critics Circle Awards, 1960
New York Film Critics Circle Awards
New York Film Critics Circle Awards
New York Film Critics Circle Awards
New York Film Critics Circle Awards